Miss World 1979, the 29th edition of the Miss World pageant, was held on 15 November 1979 at the Royal Albert Hall in London, UK. The winner was Gina Swainson from Bermuda. She was crowned by Miss World 1978, Silvana Suarez of Argentina. First runner-up was Carolyn Seaward representing the United Kingdom and second runner-up was Debbie Campbell from Jamaica. Swainson was a first runner-up in Miss Universe 1979 represented Bermuda and Carolyn Seaward was a second runner-up in same pageant represented England.

Live television coverage of the contest was largely abandoned by the BBC as a result of a trade union dispute typical of the era in Britain, when sound engineers refused to work, and the BBC decided shortly beforehand that it could not show live pictures without a commentary. The parade of the contestants in their national costumes and each of the entrants in their evening wear had been recorded the night before, so this was televised, followed later in the evening with the crowning of the winner with mute pictures narrated by Ray Moore. A unscheduled repeat of Futtocks End was televised to bridge the two segments. For later overseas transmission, a commentary was added to the silent pictures of the entire event, but the interviews with the final 7 contestants were never shown.

Results

Placements

Contestants

Notes

Debuts

Returns

Last competed in 1973:
 
Last competed in 1976:
 
Last competed in 1977:

References

External links
 Pageantopolis – Miss World 1979

Miss World
1979 in London
1979 beauty pageants
Beauty pageants in the United Kingdom
Events at the Royal Albert Hall
November 1979 events in the United Kingdom